Mohammad Ali Zolfigol is an Iranian professor of chemistry and current Minister of Science, Research and Technology, since August 25, 2021. He was the President of Bu-Ali Sina University from August 2, 2008 to June 8, 2014.

In 2022 Zolfigol had four of his research publications retracted by the Royal Society of Chemistry because of concerns regarding the authenticity of chemicals used in the published studies and the reproducibility of the experiments.

References 

 رؤسای دانشگاه بوعلی سینا از ابتدا تا کنون. (Persian). Official Website of Bu-Ali Sina University. Accessed 14 August 2021
 هدایت‌گری خوب برای کشتی آموزش عالی/ چقدر دکتر زلفی‌گل را می‌شناسید؟. (Persian). Fars News Agency. Accessed 14 August 2021
 رئیسی فهرست وزرای پیشنهادی دولت سیزدهم را به مجلس معرفی کرد+ سوابق. (Persian). Fars News Agency. Accessed 14 August 2021
 Mohammad Ali Zolfigol. Google Scholar. Accessed 15 August 2021
 Mohammad Ali Zolfigol. Publons. Accessed 15 August 2021
 Mohammad Ali Zolfigol. ResearchGate. Accessed 15 August 2021
 Mohammad Ali Zolfigol. ORCID. Accessed 15 August 2021
 An efficient catalytic method for the synthesis of pyrido&lsqb;2,3-d&rsqb;pyrimidines as biologically drug candidates by using novel magnetic nanoparticles as a reusable catalyst. Moradi, Saeid, Zolfigol, Mohammad Ali, Zarei, Mahmoud, Alonso, Diego A., Khoshnood, Abbas and Tajally, Aria. (2018). Applied Organometallic Chemistry. Volume32, Issue2.  https://doi.org/10.1002/aoc.4043
 List of Ministerial Nominees Presented to Parliament. Financial Tribune. August 11, 2021. Accessed 15 August 2021
 President Raisi Introduces Proposed Cabinet to Iranian Parliament. Tasnim News Agency. August 11, 2021. Accessed 15 August 2021
 "Personal Page". Bu-Ali Sina University, Faculty of Chemistry

External links

 Zolfigol Group

1966 births
Academic staff of Bu-Ali Sina University
Living people
Iranian chemists
Recipients of the Order of Research
Shiraz University alumni
Ministers of science of Iran